The 2017 D.C. United season was D.C. United's 22nd season of existence, and their 22nd in Major League Soccer, the top flight of American soccer.

An array of injuries to key players such as Steve Birnbaum and Patrick Mullins greatly affected D.C. United's form, as the team's scoring output and defensive performance suffered. United finished at the bottom of the Eastern Conference, and second-bottom of the overall league table. United failed to qualify for the MLS Cup Playoffs for the first time since 2013, and for only the second time in the last six seasons. United also had a short spell in the 2017 U.S. Open Cup, where they were bounced in the fifth round proper by New England Revolution.

The season was also United's final season at Robert F. Kennedy Memorial Stadium, ending a 22-year run for the club leasing the stadium. RFK Stadium was the final original stadium to be used by one of the charter franchises in MLS. It was at the time, the longest tenure for an MLS team in a specific stadium. Starting the following season, United moved into Audi Field, a soccer-specific stadium situated in the Buzzard Point neighborhood of Washington, D.C.

Review

Off season
D.C. United began the off-season by dealing a copy of international reserve players to gain spots on the expansion draft protection list for domestic players they valued more. Former draft choice Miguel Aguilar and Kennedy Igboananike were traded, with the team acquiring lower round draft picks. None of United's players were selected in the 2016 MLS Expansion Draft, allowing the team to focus on building on the foundation of the surprising 2016 team. Luciano Acosta's loan status ended as he was signed on a permanent transfer from Boca Juniors. Shortly after the expansion draft, the team announced it had acquired on loan from Club Sport Herediano a young forward, José Guillermo Ortiz who was transferred from Alajuelense, for whom he had scored twice against D.C. in CONCACAF Champions League play, to Club Sport Herediano, which turned around and loaned him out to D.C. United. In the 2017 MLS SuperDraft D.C. dipped into a familiar talent pool, selecting University of Maryland fullback Chris Odoi-Atsem in the first round, In the second round, the team selected goalie Eric Klenofsky and defender Jo Vetle Rimstad. Following the draft, the team signed a Homegrown Player deal with midfielder Ian Harkes, winner of the Hermann Trophy and son of former D.C. United captain John Harkes. Before the season started, the team also added some veteran depth, signing Sebastien Le Toux.

Early season
The month of March proved to be frustrating. DC opened the season with a scoreless draw at home against Sporting Kansas City, followed by 2 straight shutout losses against New York City FC and Columbus Crew SC, barely creating any chances. Finally, the United offense broke through in their fourth match as off-season signing José Guillermo Ortiz scored an early goal against the Philadelphia Union on a deflected shot. Luciano Acosta added a penalty kick goal to give D.C. a 2–0 lead, which held up for a 2–1 victory as United recorded first win of the season. D.C. followed that result with a surprising 2–1 victory over NYCFC, on goals by Lloyd Sam and Acosta. Despite a subsequent 2–0 loss at New York Red Bulls, United continued a good stretch of play with a 2–2 draw at New England Revolution, on goals by Jared Jeffrey and Le Toux. D.C. United's first ever trip to Atlanta resulted in 3–1 victory, as the visitors rallied after an early goal, evening the score on an own goal and sealing the three points on goals by Le Toux and Acosta.

D.C. could not sustain those results, though, and dropped the next three matches at home, once again failing to score in three straight matches, including losses to Montreal Impact, Philadelphia Union and Chicago Fire. D.C. went on the road to play Vancouver Whitecaps and earned another road win, on Lamar Neagle's penalty kick goal. that result was followed by yet another 3 game scoreless stretch including a loss to Orlando City S.C., a home draw with LA Galaxy, and a 2–0 loss to Toronto F.C. Following that loss, United added Deshorn Brown to try to inject some venom into the attack. United did get back on the winning side, with a 2–1 victory of goals by Acosta and Patrick Nyarko, as expansion side Atlanta United F.C. made its first visit to D.C. It would be two more months before D.C. United recorded another victory.
 
Shutout road losses in Philadelphia and Montreal were sandwiched around a 2–1 U.S. Open Cup loss in New England despite an early goal by Ortiz. A trip to F.C. Dallas produced a disappointing 4–2 result, despite goals by Harkes and Brown, the first goals for each in a United uniform. Another road trip to face Seattle Sounders F.C. resulted in a 4–3 defeat, with United becoming the first Major League Soccer team to lose after taking a 3–0 lead. Brown and Harkes got the side off to a fast start with goals in their second straight game, and Sam added what might have seemed a clincher, but the late collapse seemed to be the ultimate word on a disastrous 2017 season. However, it only got worse. United lost to Houston Dynamo by 3–1, despite what would prove to be Bobby Boswell's last goal for D.C. United. That would be the team's fifth straight loss, the last four with Travis Worra in goal because Bill Hamid was with the national team for the 2017 CONCACAF Gold Cup. The first visit to Minnesota United marked Hamid's return to the lineup, but the defense was still wanting during a 4–0 thrashing by the previously struggling expansion side, the sixth straight loss for D.C. United.

Summer signings
Those losses provided the impetus for the front office to finally move to bolster the team. Boswell was sent to Atlanta to free up roster space. Neagle was returned to Seattle for the same reason, and Le Toux was given his release. Ortiz and Alhaji Kamara were released to free up international roster slots. D.C. added young Bolivian striker Bruno Miranda. That signing was followed in days to come by the acquisition of Hungarian international Zoltan Stieber, who was playing in the Bundesliga second-flight, and a dramatic move to sign U.S. international Paul Arriola, after dealing $500,000 in allocation funds to acquire his MLS rights from the L.A. Galaxy. In addition to Arriola, the team added a U.S. youth international, Russell Canouse. The Pennsylvania native left Germany to return and play for his boyhood favorite team. The wheeling and dealing also included the acquisition of former Columbus Crew standout goalkeeper Steve Clark, to provide insurance in case the team was unable to sign star goalie Bill Hamid to a new contract.

These moves really did seem to raise the play of the team. United almost took three points from league-leading Toronto after an early goal by Sam, but an own goal by Steve Birnbaum forced the team to settle for a draw. D.C. did lose two consecutive hard-fought 1–0 matches, against Real Salt Lake and Colorado Rapids. D.C. then completed a sweep of the season series with Atlanta United, winning 1–0 on an own goal. In the next match, the team earned the win over New England on a second-half goal by Acosta. Homegrown player centerback Jalen Robinson contributed to the consecutive clean sheets, going 90 in each, only his second and third appearance of the year.

While August had seemed bright for D.C., September saw the team suffer more reversals. Sloppy defensive play allowed Orlando City S.C. to take a 2–0 first half lead at R.F.K. Stadium, and a late goal by Kofi Opare was not enough to salvage a result. Despite a strong start in Chicago, an own goal by Harkes put the team behind the eight-ball, and the Chicago Fire sealed the deal with 2 second-half goals. However, the D.C. team rebounded before over 25,000 people in the next-to-last ever home game at R.F.K. Stadium, against San Jose Earthquakes. D.C. failed to convert on a number of early chances, but the second half produced the fastest four-goal outburst by one player in league history, as Patrick Mullins ended his long goalless start to the 2017 season, scoring a hat trick with 3 finishes in front of goal, followed by a stunning free kick goal to cap the 4–0 win. Mullins was the first player to score four goals in one half of a MLS match. New Designated Player Paul Arriola got his first two assists in his seventh game with the team. The game may have also been noteworthy for being Steve Clark's first match in goal for D.C. Clark was barely tested in turning in a clean sheet. The win did not move the team out of the Eastern Conference cellar, but it did move the team ahead of a pair of Western Conference teams in the league-wide table. It also raised questions as to what might have been for a team that never seemed to finish chances, wasting the frequent heroic efforts of goalie Bill Hamid throughout the season.

D.C. kicked off a three-game road trip with a midweek match against New York Red Bulls. As usual, NYRB dominated possession and took the lead when youngster Tyler Adams scored his first career MLS goal. D.C., however, drew even on a free kick in first half stoppage time, as Zoltan Stieber notched his first in MLS when the ball deflected off the wall past NY goalie Luis Robles. The home team constantly tested the D.C. goal but Clark (playing for an injured Hamid) proved up to the task, including stopping a point-blank shot by Bradley Wright-Phillips. Against the run of play, D.C. briefly took the lead, when Russell Canouse got his first assist, threading a pass to Mullins, who scored his fifth goal in five days. NYRB, however, regained the lead on another goal by Adams and penalty kick goal by Gonzalo Veron. D.C. seemed destined for defeat, but they struck again in stoppage time, the tying goal coming when a defender misplayed a cross by Canouse, resulting in an own goal, the fourth of the season that counted for United. Nonetheless, D.C. needed a full three points to remain in playoff contention, so the draw ended any possibility of post-season play.

With little to lay for on a trip to Columbus, D.C. United fell 2-0. A road game in Portland started brightly, but a giveaway in the box by Korb forced Clark to foul, and the resultant penalty kick put United in a hole. The Timbers added three goals in the second half, including one while defender Steve Birnbaum lay unconscious, suffering his third concussion of the season.

RFK finale
In the build-up to the final match of the season, the team sought to honor their history in R.F.K. Stadium. as they prepared to leave the stadium behind. First, came the announcement that longtime goalkeeper Bill Hamid would not return in 2018, having agreed to join a team in Denmark, F.C. Midtjylland. On the day of the game, players from the team's 21-year history came together for a "Legends" game, featuring goals by Marco Etcheverry, Luciano Emilio and Freddy Adu, among others. The main event was the deciding event of the 2018 version of the Atlantic Cup, against New York Red Bulls. One of the largest regular-season home crowds in team history came to celebrate history, but also had the pleasure of seeing the team take the lead before halftime on a scintillating cross by Acosta that was finished by Arriola, who scored his first ever MLS goal, which later captured Goal of the Week honors. The visitors tied the score in the second half and, after Acosta was ejected, it was probably only a matter of time before the Red Bulls took the lead. As it was, D.C. closed the season with yet another defeat—the third consecutive loss, and finished even on points with the L.A. Galaxy in the league cellar. Because D.C. had more wins, they would be drafting after the Galaxy in the league's 2018 pre-season drafts.

Non-competitive

Preseason

Competitive

MLS

U.S. Open Cup

Player statistics

Appearances and goals 

|-
! colspan="12" style="background:#dcdcdc; text-align:center"| Goalkeepers

|-
! colspan="12" style="background:#dcdcdc; text-align:center"| Defenders

|-
! colspan="12" style="background:#dcdcdc; text-align:center"| Midfielders

|-
! colspan="12" style="background:#dcdcdc; text-align:center"|Forwards

|-
! colspan="12" style="background:#dcdcdc; text-align:center"|Left during the season
|-

|-
|}

Top scorers

Disciplinary record

Transfers

In 

|-
|}

Draft picks 
Draft picks are not automatically signed to the team roster. Only trades involving draft picks and executed after the start of 2017 MLS SuperDraft will be listed in the notes.

Out

Notes

References 

D.C. United seasons
Dc United
Dc United
2017 in sports in Washington, D.C.